Rosli is both a given name and a surname. 

Notable people with the given name include:
Rosli Dhobi (1932–1950), Malaysian rebel
Rosli Liman (born 1969), Bruneian footballer 
Roslï Näf (1911–1996), Swiss nurse
 Rosli Ahmat (1970–2002), Singaporean executed armed robber and murderer

Notable people with the surname or patronymic include:
Arnold Rösli (1879-?), Swiss sports shooter 
Arulraj Rosli (1940–2016), Malaysian cyclist
Azriddin Rosli (born 1995), Malaysian footballer
Che Rosli (born 1951), Malaysian politician
Durratun Nashihin Rosli (born 1988), Malaysian rhythmic gymnast
Faisal Rosli (born 1991), Malaysian footballer
Faris Shah Rosli (born 1995), Malaysian footballer
Khairul Izuan Rosli (born 1991), Malaysian footballer
Ramdan Rosli (born 1996), Malaysian motorcycle racer

Notable people with the alias include:
Rosli (alias), alias of Singaporean criminal Mohamed Yasin Hussin

Malaysian given names